Ali Suat Hayri Ürgüplü (13 August 1903, in Damascus, Ottoman Empire – 26 December 1981, in Istanbul, Turkey) was a Turkish politician who served a brief term as Prime Minister of Turkey in 1965. He was also the last Prime Minister to be born outside the territory of present-day Turkey, being born in Damascus, which was then part of the Ottoman Empire.

Early life
Ürgüplü graduated from Galatasaray High School. He was the descendant of a distinguished line of Ottoman religious scholars and administrators. His father was the celebrated Sheikh ul-Islam Ürgüplü Hayri Efendi, minister of religious affairs under the Committee of Union and Progress (or Young Turk) regime of 1913–1918.

Career
After a brief career as a judge, Ürgüplü entered the Parliament in 1939 and served as Minister of Customs and Public Monopolies in the Şükrü Saracoğlu cabinet in 1947–1948. He returned to the senate of Parliament in 1961 and was its chairman from 27 November 1963 to 6 November 1963. Ürgüplü was asked to form a non-partisan caretaker cabinet after the collapse of Premier İsmet İnönü's coalition government in 1965. The cabinet was formed on 5 February, and served until the parliamentary elections of 10 October, although it never received a vote of confidence in Parliament.

Ürgüplü continued to serve in the senate until 1972. He died on 27 December 1981 in Istanbul and was interred at the 
Edirnekapı Martyr's Cemetery.

References

External links
 Who is who database - Suat Hayri Ürgüplü (1903 - 1981)
 Biyografi.net - Biography of Suat Hayri Ürgüplü

1903 births
1981 deaths
20th-century prime ministers of Turkey
People from Damascus
Galatasaray High School alumni
Istanbul University alumni
Istanbul University Faculty of Law alumni
Prime Ministers of Turkey
20th-century Turkish diplomats
Burials at Edirnekapı Martyr's Cemetery
Galatasaray athletes
Syrian people of Turkish descent
Ambassadors of Turkey to the United Kingdom
Ambassadors of Turkey to the United States
Justice Party (Turkey) politicians
Ambassadors of Turkey to Spain
Ambassadors of Turkey to West Germany
Members of the Senate of the Republic (Turkey)
Ministers of Customs and Trade of Turkey
Members of the 29th government of Turkey
Members of the 14th government of Turkey
Grand Crosses 1st class of the Order of Merit of the Federal Republic of Germany